The Sanxia History Museum is a museum of local history in Sanxia District, New Taipei, Taiwan.

History
The museum building was originally built as the township office during the Japanese rule in 1929. The reconstruction process to make the museum from the former building started in 1999 for 4 years.

Architecture
The museum is a two-story building. The first floor has an exhibition area that periodically hosts art activities. The second floor has an exhibition area of Sanxia historical items, old time implements and memorabilia.

Transportation
The museum is accessible southeast from Yingge Station of Taiwan Railways.

See also
 List of museums in Taiwan

References

2003 establishments in Taiwan
Buildings and structures completed in 1929
Local museums in Taiwan
Museums in New Taipei
Museums established in 2003